The 2020 Ohio Republican presidential primary took place through April 28, 2020, completely by mail-in voting. Due to the COVID-19 pandemic in the United States the primary, originally scheduled for March 17, 2020, was moved and voting by mail was designated as the sole voting form and extended until April 28, 2020, with April 27 being the final deadline for a ballot to have been received and postmarked by the post. Hand-dropping the mail-in ballot on April 28 was also possible.

Results

References 

Republican primary
Ohio
June 2020 events in the United States
Ohio Republican primaries